Yuppi du is a 1975 Italian comedy film directed by Adriano Celentano. It is the second film directed by the singer-songwriter after Super rapina a Milano in 1964.

The film was presented at 1975 Cannes Film Festival. and it won the award for best music at Nastri d'argento 1976.

Plot
Felice Pietà is a man of modest means who lives with his second wife, Adelaide. Together, they raise Monica, a daughter Felice had with his first wife Silvia, who had committed suicide years before for unknown reasons.

Having never really accepted the loss of Silvia, Felice decides to visit the place where she had taken her own life one last time. There, to his surprise, Silvia appears, and reveals to him that she made up her own suicide to leave him since she was tired of living in poverty with him in Venice. She reveals that she has now decided to come back because she missed her life with him. Therefore, Felice leaves Adelaide to start a new life with Silvia who he's still in love with.

Silvia decides to leave for London to clear things up with her current husband so Felice suggests bringing their daughter with her. Silvia leaves without actually coming back. Only after a few months Felice learns where Silvia and Monica live. He then reaches them in Milan, where Silvia's new rich husband emphasizes his wife's wishes to mantain her new life with the luxuries she's now used to while at the same time wanting to get her daughter back, despite the legal difficulties. At this point, Felice - using this cold market-like logic- suggests a sale by weight of Monica. Silvia's husband tries to haggle over Monica's weight, and eventually pays 45 millions for the child.
On the train trip back to Venice, Felice meets a woman who looks exactly like Silvia. The silent dialogue between them takes place through the voiceovers of the characters. Felice replies to the promise of eternal love and happiness made by the woman saying he does not believe in love anymore and knows that her sole purpose is to take away his money.

Cast
 Claudia Mori as Adelaide
 Charlotte Rampling as Silvia
 Gino Santercole as Napoleone
 Adriano Celentano as Felice Della Pietà
 Rosita Celentano as Monica
 Carla Brait as The Maid
 Memo Dittongo as Scognamillo
 John Lee
 Carla Mancini (credit only)
 Lino Toffolo as Nane
 Sonia Viviani as Napoleone's girl
 Raffaele di Sipio as Man in the toilet (uncredited)
 Pippo Starnazza as Old man in Milan bar (uncredited)

References

External links

1975 films
1975 comedy films
Italian comedy films
1970s Italian-language films
Films directed by Adriano Celentano
1970s Italian films